The 2011 GP3 Series season was the second season of the GP3 Series, a feeder series for the GP2 Series. The season began at Istanbul Park on 7 May and concluded at Autodromo Nazionale Monza on 11 September after eight rounds made up of two races each and all in support of European Formula 1 Grands Prix. The 2010 champion Esteban Gutiérrez graduated to the GP2 Series so did not defend his title.

After the early rounds, the likes of Mitch Evans, Nigel Melker, Andrea Caldarelli and Alexander Sims were fighting for the championship lead. However, Caldarelli had to retire from the series due to failing to raise a sufficient budget for the whole season. Sims then held the lead after consistent podium finishes in both Valencia and Silverstone. This was not to last though, as the Finn Valtteri Bottas started to find his speed at Nürburgring, taking the top spot after winning the first race at Hungaroring while Sims was disqualified due rear floor height check. Bottas led the championship with 7 points from Sims. Total of 6 drivers were within 13 points from Bottas at that time.

Bottas was able to secure the title in the first race of Monza. In that race he took the chequered flag and his closest rival and team-mate James Calado was left to second place. As 7 points is the maximum from Sunday's race and Bottas had more victories than Calado, the 7-point gap between them was enough for Bottas to clinch the title with one race still to go.

Teams and drivers

Driver changes
 Changed teams
 Michael Christensen moved from MW Arden to RSC Mücke Motorsport. Team-mate Leonardo Cordeiro also changed teams, moving to Carlin.
 After racing with Carlin in two meetings in 2010, António Félix da Costa moved into the series full-time with Status Grand Prix after claiming top rookie honours in the Formula 3 Euro Series. Another Carlin driver, Dean Smith, moved to the Addax Team.
 Vittorio Ghirelli switched from Atech CRS GP to Jenzer Motorsport.
 After missing the opening round, Daniel Morad joined Carlin from Status Grand Prix.
 Simon Trummer, who finished 25th in 2010 with Jenzer Motorsport, moved to MW Arden.

 Entering/Re-Entering GP3 Series
 Formula Renault MEC champion Zoël Amberg joined the series with Atech CRS GP.
 Luciano Bacheta, the Formula Renault Eurocup runner-up, joined the series with RSC Mücke Motorsport.
 Valtteri Bottas joined the championship, having finished third in the Formula 3 Euro Series. He will continue with the Lotus ART team that he drove for in the Euro Series.
 James Calado joined the championship, having finished runner-up to Jean-Éric Vergne in British Formula 3 with Carlin. He will join Bottas at Lotus ART.
 Andrea Caldarelli, who finished third in Italian Formula Three, moved into the championship with Tech 1 Racing. Aaro Vainio joined him, having driven for the French squad in the Formula Renault Eurocup, finishing fourth in the standings.
 Gabriel Chaves stepped up from Italian Formula Three to GP3 with the Addax Team. He was joined by Dominic Storey, who moved over from a one-off drive in the Formula Renault 3.5 Series.
 Star Mazda champion Conor Daly joined the series for Carlin. He was joined by German Formula Three champion Tom Dillmann for the first round of the series in Istanbul Park.
 Having competed in Australian Formula Three and the Toyota Racing Series since the start of 2010, Mitch Evans joined MW Arden.
 Matias Laine made his debut in the series with Manor Racing, having competed in the Formula 3 Euro Series for Motopark Academy in 2010.
 Formula Renault UK race-winners Tamás Pál Kiss, Marlon Stöckinger, Lewis Williamson and Nick Yelloly all joined the series. Pál Kiss drove for Tech 1 Racing, Williamson drove for MW Arden while Stöckinger and Yelloly drove for Atech CRS GP.
 Alexander Sims made his debut in the series with Status Grand Prix, having finished fourth in the Formula 3 Euro Series for ART Grand Prix.
 Maxim Zimin joined the series with Jenzer Motorsport, having competed with the team in Formula Abarth.

 Leaving GP3 Series
 Mirko Bortolotti, who finished eleventh for Barwa Addax, and Tobias Hegewald, who finished 22nd with RSC Mücke Motorsport, both returned to Formula Two for 2011. They were joined by Miki Monrás, who was tenth for MW Arden.
 Stefano Coletti and Pål Varhaug joined the GP2 Series with Trident Racing and DAMS respectively. 2010 champion Esteban Gutiérrez also joined GP2 with Lotus ART as well as being reserve driver for Formula One team Sauber.
 James Jakes, after initially signing to race in GP2 with Scuderia Coloni, raced in the IndyCar Series with Dale Coyne Racing.
 Josef Newgarden returned to his native United States to compete in Indy Lights for Sam Schmidt Motorsports.
 Alexander Rossi and Robert Wickens moved into the Formula Renault 3.5 Series. Rossi, who finished fourth in 2010 with ART Grand Prix, drove for Fortec Motorsport while championship runner-up Wickens drove for Carlin.

2011 Schedule
The 2011 calendar was announced on 18 January 2011. The series consisted of eight rounds. A prospective ninth round in Monaco was dropped on 2 February 2011 due to a lack of paddock space. It supported every other European Formula One event.

Results

Championship standings

Drivers' Championship

Teams' Championship

 Drivers who did not finish the race but were classified are marked with †.

Footnotes

References

External links
 Official website

GP3
GP3 Series seasons
GP3
GP3 Series